Formula One is a series of computer and video games originally created by Psygnosis, who were eventually renamed to Studio Liverpool. It takes its name from the popular car racing series of the same name. Since 2001, the Formula One series had been made by Studio Liverpool (an internal Sony Computer Entertainment Europe game studio) formed from the restructuring of several studios including Psygnosis, which soon followed with the obtaining of an exclusive FOA Official Licence, which barred any other company to produce a Formula One game for any other platform for 5 years. Sony used this exclusive licence to make Formula One games from 2003 until 2007, releasing a new title every year which included improvements to the graphics engine as well as an updated and complete F1 grid showing the latest liveries, chassis and drivers. The series covered every year from 1995 to 2006, with the exception of the 1996 season. In February 2007, it was announced that Sony had lost the license to produce Formula One video games, meaning Formula One Championship Edition, released at the very end of the previous year, was to be the last game in a series that lasted more than a decade. In May 2008, Codemasters picked up the license, with Sumo Digital, producing F1 2009 for the PSP and Nintendo Wii a year and a half later. Codemasters took over the license proper in 2010, and as of 2020, currently maintain the rights to exclusively produce Formula One games.

Games

References

External links
 

 
Sony Interactive Entertainment franchises
Video game franchises
Video game franchises introduced in 1996